Erythricium salmonicolor is a species of fungus in the family Corticiaceae. Basidiocarps are effused, corticioid, smooth, and pinkish and grow on wood. The fungus is a commercially significant plant pathogen which has become a serious problem, especially in Brazil. Erythricium salmonicolor causes Pink Disease, most commonly in Citrus, although E. salmonicolor has a wide host range including rubber and cacao trees. Pink Disease causes branch and stem die-back due to canker formation. The cankers are recognizable by gum exudation and longitudinal splitting of the bark.

Hosts and symptoms
Erythricium salmonicolor has a very broad host range. The host plants of greatest importance include rubber, tea, coffee, cacao, grapefruit, orange, nutmeg, mango, apple, coca, and kola. Pink Disease can cause heavy losses including individual branch death to the loss of the whole tree in cases where the main stem or several branches are affected. E. salmonicolor causes girdling cankers which prevent the normal function of some physiological processes, eventually leading to defoliation and die-back of outer branches. On rubber trees, initial stages of infection appear as drops of latex and silky-white mycelial growth on the bark surface. In black pepper plants, sterile pink to white pustules approximately 1 mm in diameter appear on young green stems. In citrus trees, sterile pustules may appear first, and in some cases the trees may have oozing sap or gum. In cacao trees, first symptoms of infection usually present as a sparse white mycelium on the bark surface, which can be easily overlooked. Trees are most susceptible in areas with high levels of rainfall, such as tropical rainforests. Diagnosis of Pink Disease is typically achieved through the use of light microscopy and scanning electron microscopy to observe sporulation of the pathogen.

Management and control
Management of E. salmonicolor and Pink Disease can be very difficult given its wide host range, making cross-infection a concern. Cultural control can be implemented by pruning frequently and burning any infected branches removed. This is effective when the disease can be recognized in the earliest stages, but it is most effective when performed concurrently with fungicide application. The encrustation and conidial pustules are able to remain functional for a period of time after the infected branches have been removed from the tree. Fungicide use varies among countries affected by the disease. In India, pre- and post-monsoon application of fungicides directly on the trunk and branches of cocoa or rubber trees effectively prevented the disease, while application of a sulphur-lime slurry to tea shrubs worked best in Kalimantan in Borneo, and Validamycin A was found to be the most effective means of control on rubber trees in Vietnam. The use of fungicides prevents the basidiospores from germinating and causing infection.

Importance
Erythricium salmonicolor is of particular importance in areas such as Colombia, China, or Thailand that rely on the export of globally important crops like coffee, tea, or rubber respectively. In cocoa, there have been reported losses of 80% or more in Western Samoa. Young trees are particularly affected by the disease, as Pink Disease typically does not kill mature trees it infects. in citrus trees in Brazil, E. salmonicolor has been shown to be responsible for reduction of citrus production by up to 10%.

See also
 List of cacao diseases
 List of citrus diseases
 List of coffee diseases
 List of mango diseases
 List of tea diseases

References

External links
 USDA ARS Fungal Database

Fungal tree pathogens and diseases
Cacao diseases
Fungal citrus diseases
Coffee diseases
Mango tree diseases
Tea diseases
Corticiales